The following list features mixed martial artists who have competed in the most bouts that were approved and regulated by a formal sanctioning body.  This includes mixed martial arts and shoot fighting, but excludes bouts in specific forms, such as boxing, grappling, or wrestling.  It also excludes any unregulated bouts.

List of fighters

See also
List of undefeated mixed martial artists

References

Lists of mixed martial artists